Nguyễn Văn Bình may refer to:

 Nguyễn Văn Bình (judoka) 
 Nguyễn Văn Bình (politician)